The University of Ghana Teaching Hospital is a 617-bed medical facility on the University of Ghana campus in Accra in the Greater Accra Region.

History
The hospital was started with loan facility from the Israeli Government. The project will cost $217 million.

References

University of Ghana
Hospitals in Ghana
Medical education in Ghana
Teaching hospitals